Salute is the debut album by AOR band 21 Guns, released in 1992. Artwork on the album was directed by Hugh Syme.

The song "Just a Wish" was later covered by Far Corporation, again with Scott Gorham on guitar.

Critical reception
Billboard magazine gave the album a positive review, singling out the "catchy leadoff track 'Knee Deep'" but conceding that the band "treads familiar turf lyrically and musically" and has little in common with Gorham's "venerable roots" in Thin Lizzy.

Track listing

Personnel
Band members
Thomas La Verdi – vocals
Scott Gorham – guitars, backing vocals, arrangements
Leif Johansen – bass guitar, keyboards, backing vocals, arrangements
Mike Sturgis – drums

Additional musicians
Kim Bullard – piano

Production
Chris Lord-Alge – producer, engineer, mixing
Mike Douglas, Eric Greedy, Richard Landers, Jason Roberts, Talley Sherwood – assistant engineers
Ria Lewerke – creative director
Bob Ludwig – mastering
Hugh Syme – art direction
Terra Managment Gabi Winzig

References

1992 debut albums
RCA Records albums
21 Guns (band) albums
Albums produced by Chris Lord-Alge